Villip is a village in the municipality of Wachtberg in the Rhein-Sieg-Kreis in the state of North Rhine-Westphalia close to the town of Meckenheim in Germany. Within Villip there can be found a smaller village under the name of Villiprott.

The village was first referenced on 10 June 873 as Philuppa. The king, Louis the German, included it under the manor of the monastery of Stablo.

References

External links 

 Website of village Villip

Villages in North Rhine-Westphalia
Rhein-Sieg-Kreis